WSFS may refer to:

 Worldcon, more formally the  World Science Fiction Convention, the annual convention of the World Science Fiction Society (WSFS).
 WSFS Bank, the common name for Wilmington Savings Fund Society, the primary subsidiary of WSFS Financial Corporation.
 WSFS (FM), a radio station (104.3 FM) licensed to Miramar, Florida, United States, serving the Miami metropolitan area.